Benjamin L. Crump College of Law is one of the graduate schools of St. Thomas University located in Miami Gardens, Florida. The College of Law was founded in 1984. According to its 2017 ABA-required disclosures, 54.7% of the Class of 2017 obtained full-time, long-term, bar-passage-required employment nine months after graduation, excluding solo practitioners. The college was renamed after civil rights attorney Benjamin Crump in 2023.

Diversity

The U.S. News & World Report Diversity index places the law school in a tie for fourth place among all ABA-accredited law schools in its Diversity Index (2008 edition). St. Thomas is also first in the nation in conferring J.D. degrees upon Hispanic students, according to Hispanic Outlook in Higher Education Magazine (December 2006 Issue) and it was ranked as number one for Hispanic students by Hispanic Outlook magazine once again in its December 2015 edition. The former and current dean, Alfredo Garcia, serving from 2007 to 2010 and since July 2014 is the first Cuban-born dean of a U.S. law school. The Princeton Review ranks St. Thomas # 3 for the Best Environment for Minority Students (2009 edition). The diverse faculty is ranked # 9 in the country according to the Princeton Review.

Programs

Joint Degrees: The faculties of the law school and the graduate school offer five joint degree programs: the J.D./M.S. in Sports Administration, the J.D./M.B.A. in Sports Administration, the J.D./M.S. in Marriage and Family Counseling, J.D./M.B.A. in International Business, and the J.D./M.B.A. in Accounting.The school also has two LL.M graduate programs, one in cybersecurity and one in intercultural human rights.

Employment 
According to St. Thomas' official 2018 ABA-required disclosures, 64.6% of the Class of 2017 obtained full-time, long-term, JD-required employment nine months after graduation, excluding solo practitioners. St. Thomas' Law School Transparency under-employment score is 27.6%, indicating the percentage of the Class of 2017 unemployed, pursuing an additional degree, or working in a non-professional, short-term, or part-time job nine months after graduation.

Costs
The Law School Transparency estimated debt-financed cost of attendance for three years is $233,742.

Publications
The law school has three publications:

 St. Thomas Law Review
 Journal of Complex Litigation
 Intercultural Human Rights Law Review

Notable alumni

Jose Baez - defense attorney in the Casey Anthony trial
Gaston Cantens - Vice President of Florida Crystals and former member of the Florida House of Representatives (1998-2004)
Ana Navarro - Republican strategist and political commentator
Juan-Carlos Planas - Former member of the Florida House of Representatives (2002-2010)
Isaac Wright Jr. - defense attorney who secured his own release and exoneration

References

External links
St. Thomas University School of Law
St. Thomas University School of Law, Official Alumni website

Catholic law schools in the United States
ABA-accredited law schools in Florida
Universities and colleges in Miami-Dade County, Florida
Miami Gardens, Florida
St. Thomas University (Florida)
1984 establishments in Florida